Robert Holmes  (1861 May, 1930), was a Canadian naturalist painter.

Biography
Robert Holes, born in Cannington, Ontario developed his skill in drawing as a youngster but his father, a blacksmith with six children, wanted him to become a doctor or teacher with a more secure means of a livelihood. Even without his father`s support, he became a student at the Toronto Art School, studying with William Cruikshank and received certificates from the school in 1883 and 1884. Upon graduation, he took up designing in fabrics and interior decorating and to further these branches of study he attended the Royal College of Art in South Kensington in London, England with A.B. Piet, W.R. Lethalay and Gerald Moira. On his return to North America, he was a student at New York University.

When he returned to Canada, he taught art in various schools in Ontario and finally settled as resident master and teacher of drawing at Upper Canada College (then King Street), Toronto, where he taught for thirty years and became a good friend of Stephen Leacock who was also a resident master. He also taught at St. Andrew's College and for a while at the Toronto Art School where he had been a pupil. From 1912 until his death in 1930, he was on the staff of the Ontario College of Art (head, department of design, and later, lecturer in the history of art and head of the department of elementary art).

He became interested in painting flowers when he wanted to teach students a project that involved a characteristically Canadian subject in design classes and found that flowers lend themselves to this purpose. To paint them, he travelled by bicycle to various parts of the country including Three Rivers, Quebec. Holmes meticulously painted in watercolour over a hundred varieties of wild flowers and did studies of the same flower in each of the four seasons. He always painted them in their natural surroundings. During his lifetime, Holmes’s work was exhibited in museums across North America and since then, his work has been hung sporadically in the Art Gallery of Ontario. He also did illustrations, such as the six coloured illustrations which he contributed to S.T. Wood's Rambles of a Canadian Naturalist (1916).

During his career he was active with many groups and societies including: the Art Students' League (1890 - Pres. 1891-1904); the Mahlstick Club (1899-1903); the Graphics Arts Club (1904 - Pres. 1909-1911); the Arts and Letters Club, Toronto (1908); the Ontario Society of Artists (1909 - Pres. 1919-1923); the Royal Canadian Academy (A.R.C.A. 1909 - R.C.A. 1921). He was the oldest faculty member at the Ontario College of Art when he died suddenly of a heart attack while addressing the students of the Ontario College of Art at the Arts and Letters Club, Toronto. His watercolour paintings (more than 30 in number) were purchased by the Art Gallery of Toronto from his estate by subscription. He is also represented in the collection of the National Gallery of Canada. His library was gifted to the Ontario College of Art. Among his books was The Art of Gerald Moira, one of his teachers in England, by Harold Watkins.

A stone plaque to his memory is today located in the Guild Park in Scarborough, Ontario. A historical plaque was also placed in MacLeod Park, Cannington, 1967, in memory of Holmes.

References

Bibliography

19th-century Canadian painters
Canadian male painters
20th-century Canadian painters
1861 births
1931 deaths
Artists from Ontario
Persons of National Historic Significance (Canada)
Alumni of the Royal College of Art
People from Brock, Ontario
Canadian art educators
Members of the Royal Canadian Academy of Arts
OCAD University alumni
Academic staff of OCAD University
19th-century Canadian male artists
20th-century Canadian male artists